Xiao Qi Ji (meaning "little miracle") is a male giant panda cub who was born at the National Zoo in Washington, D.C. on 21 August 2020.  The fourth surviving cub of Mei Xiang and Tian Tian, Xiao Qi Ji is a result of an artificial insemination of Mei Xiang on March 22, 2020. Xiao Qi Ji is the youngest brother of Tai Shan, Bao Bao and Bei Bei.

Birth
Xiao Qi Ji was born on August 21, 2020, at 6:35 PM to Mei Xiang and Tian Tian the National Zoo's second pair of giant pandas. With Xiao Qi Ji's birth, Mei Xiang, who is aged 22 years, set a record of being the oldest giant panda in the United States to give birth and the second oldest panda to give birth in the world.  He is the fourth surviving cub of Mei Xiang and Tian Tian.  He was also a part of an artificial insemination of Mei Xiang on March 22, 2020, shortly after the National Zoo closed down due to the COVID-19 Pandemic.

Naming
As a result of an online vote held on the Zoo's website, Xiao Qi Ji's name was chosen and revealed 100 days after his birth, on November 23, 2020. The four choices for names were 小奇迹 (Xiǎo Qíjì, meaning "little miracle"), 幸福 (Xìngfú, meaning "happy and prosperous"), 福仔 (Fú Zǎi, meaning "prosperous boy"), and 仔仔 (Zǎi Zǎi, a traditional Chinese nickname for a boy). People such as Steve Monfort, Lonnie Bunch, Cui Tiankai, Muriel Bowser, David M. Rubenstein and a group of students of the Sunshine School of Chinese Embassy gave remarks on the naming event on a video on YouTube.

Viewing

Xiao Qi Ji made his public debut on May 21, 2021, when the National Zoo reopened because of being closed due to the COVID-19 Pandemic.

References

External links
Giant Pandas at the National Zoo
Panda Cam at National Zoo

Individual giant pandas
2020 animal births